A ristra is an arrangement of drying chile pepper pods, garlic bulbs, or other vegetables for later consumption. In addition to its practical use, the ristra has come to be a trademark of decorative design in the state of New Mexico as well as southern Arizona. Typically, large chiles such as New Mexico chiles and Anaheim peppers are used, although any kind of chile may be used.

Garlic can also be arranged into a ristra for drying and curing after the bulbs have matured and the leaves have died away.

Ristras are "commonly used for decoration; they are said to bring health and good luck."

References

See also
 List of dried foods
 

Dried foods
Chili peppers
Food and drink decorations
New Mexican cuisine